My Lady Carey's Dompe is a Renaissance musical piece, most probably written for lute and harpsichord.  A traditional English dance tune, it was written  by an unknown composer during the time of Henry VIII of England, who played various instruments, of which he had a large collection.

History
My Lady Carey's Dompe is sometimes attributed to English innovative composer of the early Tudor period, Hugh Aston.  It is in G Dorian mode and consists of an improvisatory treble line over a drone alternating between two bass notes, G and D.  It may have been written for the death of William Carey, a courtier and favorite of Henry VIII, who died on 22 June 1528, and in this case, Lady Carey may refer to his wife Mary Boleyn, one of the mistresses of Henry VIII and the sister of Henry's second wife, Anne Boleyn, but also to Carey’s mother, sisters and sister-in-law.  Dompe, which may come from Irish dump that means lament, can refer to a dance, a dirge, a lament or a melancholic love song.

The work appears in a single source written around 1530, British Library, manuscript Royal Appendix 58 (Roy. App. 58).

Notable recordings
My Lady Carey's Dompe is in the repertoire of many artists including Igor Kipnis, Guy Bovet, Rafael Puyana, Ton Koopman, Peter Watchorn, André Isoir, Liuwe Tamminga, Paul O'Dette, David Munrow, Eduardo Paniagua, Brett Leighton, Grayston Burgess, Claudio Brizi.

See also
 1520s in music
 Early music of the British Isles#Henry VIII and James V
 English folk music (1500–1899)

References

Sources

External links

 
 10 Pieces for the Virginals or Organ (Anonymous)
 Arrangement by Anton Batagov

Year of song unknown
Compositions for harpsichord
Compositions for lute
Compositions in D minor
Compositions in G minor
Renaissance compositions